Coatlán Zapotec (Western Miahuatlán Zapotec) is a Zapotec language spoken in southern Oaxaca, Mexico. It uses linguolabial sounds as onomatopoeia.

It is also known as San Miguel Zapotec and Zapoteco de Santa María Coatlán, to distinguish it from Zapoteco de San Vicente Coatlán.

References

Sources
 Beam de Azcona, Rosemary G. 2004. A Coatlán-Loxicha Zapotec Grammar. Ph.D. dissertation. University of California, Berkeley.

External links
AILLA resources for Coatlán-Loxicha Zapotec

Dr. Beam de Azcona on Coatlán-Loxicha Zapotec (Spanish and English)

Languages of Mexico
Zapotec languages